The Score with Edmund Stone is a radio program that began in 2006. The program is produced by KQAC, All Classical Portland and hosted by Edmund Stone. Stone broadcasts film music weekly on Saturdays and Sundays. Each one-hour program features a specific composer, film genre or theme. The program is sponsored by Oregon based whole grains brand Bob's Red Mill Natural Foods since 2008.  Multiple cities across the United States air the program.

References

External links

Film music
American music radio programs